Tourism is an important industry in Montreal, Quebec, Canada. The city welcomed 10.2 million overnight visitors in 2016 and 11,792,970 day trip visitors in 2010. Montreal attracted 1,770,939 international overnight visitors in 2010, most of them from the United States, France, the United Kingdom, Germany, Mexico and Japan. 82,740 direct jobs and 48,199 indirect jobs in Montreal were generated by the tourism industry in 2014.

Crescent Street in Downtown Montreal is popular among tourists. Throughout the summer, it features various street fairs and festivals. Among locals, Crescent Street is known better for its many clubs and bars. Saint-Laurent Boulevard and the surrounding Plateau Mont-Royal neighbourhood, are also well known for their nightlife, with many bars, nightclubs and restaurants.

The main sectors that attract tourism in Montreal are Festivals drawing in 7.5 million tourists, museums accounting for 7 million visits and Old Montreal bringing in 2.5 million tourists in the year 2013.

Attractions

References

External links

 Tourism Montreal